Tunoa Tevaerai (born 18 June 1992) is a Tahitian footballer who plays as a midfielder. He comes out for the Tahitian team AS Tefana and the Tahitian national football team.

Career

International
Tevaerai made his first senior international appearance in a 2018 FIFA World Cup qualifier against the Solomon Islands on 8 November 2016, having substituted Tefai Faehau-Heitaa in the 72nd minute.

Honours
Tefana
Tahiti First Division (2): 2014–15, 2015–16

References

External links
 
 

1992 births
Living people
Association football midfielders
French Polynesian footballers
Tahiti international footballers